Jamie Garry Stott  is an English footballer who plays for National League club FC Halifax Town.

Club career
Jamie is an academy graduate, having been at Oldham Athletic since the age of nine. He has had numerous loans spells at non-league clubs in the North-West of England, including two spells at Stockport County, where he has won young player of the season awards. In the 2019/20 season Jamie was looking to secure a first team spot in the Stockport squad after winning the league with them in 2019.

In August 2021, Stott returned to National League North side AFC Fylde on loan for the season.

Stott was released by Stockport following promotion to the Football League in the 2021–22 season, signing for FC Halifax Town in June 2022.

Career statistics

References

External links

1997 births
Living people
People from Failsworth
English footballers
Association football defenders
Oldham Athletic A.F.C. players
Curzon Ashton F.C. players
Stockport County F.C. players
AFC Fylde players
FC Halifax Town players
English Football League players
National League (English football) players